James Robert Talbot (born 23 April 1960 in London) is an English jazz alto saxophonist.

Talbot played with the London Schools Symphony Orchestra and then with the National Youth Jazz Orchestra. He attended the Royal College of Music during 1978–79, then recorded throughout the decades of the 1980s and 1990s with Clark Tracey, Stan Tracey, Jack Sharpe, John Dankworth, Colin Towns, Guy Barker, Richard Niles, Shorty Rogers, Michael Nyman, and Bud Shank. He also performed with singers Ella Fitzgerald, Frank Sinatra, George Michael, and Mel Tormé, as well as for the arrangers Nelson Riddle, Gil Evans, and Quincy Jones. He has worked extensively as a session musician in commercial studios.

In addition to saxophone, Talbot also occasionally plays clarinet, both in jazz and classical settings.

Discography as leader
Altitude, 1986 LP

References
Mark Gilbert, "Jamie Talbot". Grove Jazz online.

1960 births
Living people
British jazz saxophonists
British male saxophonists
Musicians from London
Alumni of the Royal College of Music
21st-century saxophonists
21st-century British male musicians
British male jazz musicians
National Youth Jazz Orchestra members